This is a list of prime ministers of the United Kingdom by age. This table can be sorted to display prime ministers of the United Kingdom by name, order of office, date of birth, age at appointment, length of retirement, or lifespan. Age at appointment is determined by the day a prime minister assumed office for the first time. Length of retirement is determined from the day a prime minister leaves office for the final time until their death.

Two measures of longevity are given; this is to allow for the differing number of leap days occurring within the life of each prime minister. The first figure is the number of days between date of birth and date of death, allowing for leap days; in parentheses the same period given in years and days, with the number of whole years that the prime minister had lived, and the days being the remaining number of days from their last birthday.

List of prime ministers

 a indicates the prime minister died in office

Graphical representation
The following chart shows prime ministers by their age (living prime ministers in green), with the years of their premiership in blue.

See also
 Timeline of prime ministers of the United Kingdom
 List of presidents of the United States by age

References

Age
United Kingdom